WAVF (101.7 MHz) is a commercial FM radio station licensed to Hanahan, South Carolina, and serving the South Carolina Lowcountry and Charleston metropolitan area.  It is owned by the Charleston Radio Group subsidiary of Saga Communications and airs an adult hits radio format branded as "Chuck FM."  The radio studios and offices are on Clements Ferry Road in Charleston.

WAVF has an effective radiated power (ERP) of 100,000 watts, the maximum for non-grandfathered FM stations.  The transmitter is off Venning Road in Mount Pleasant.

History

WAVF history
Founder and Tin Man Broadcasting Managing Partner Paul W Robinson (Emerald City Media Partners) launched WAVF on March 11, 1985 on 96.1 FM as  "96 Wave" with sound effects of ocean waves over a period of a week. When the stunt was over, the station debuted with an Album Rock format. Over time, 96 Wave shifted its format to Alternative.

Atom Taler worked at 96 Wave nine years. For the last three of those years he was joined by Jim Voigt, known as "The Critic". Their popular morning show, which was beginning to decline, was replaced February 23, 1998 by Howard Stern. Ratings fell still further, but program director Rob Cressman pointed out ratings increased from a year earlier. He also said the station would improve with a format that relied less on alternative. After a year and a half, Stern had the market's no. 1 morning show. WAVF also brought back The Critic for afternoons.

96 Wave was sold to Apex Broadcasting late in 2001.

On February 22, 2002, 96 Wave dropped Stern. Many advertisers did not like the show, so they would buy time on 96 Wave but not on Stern's show, or they avoided WAVF altogether. Stern's show also cost the station a lot, so airing his show just became too expensive. I Dick Dale from WMMS in Cleveland replaced Stern. WMMS created the show to compete with Stern and began syndicating it to Clear Channel stations. But Dale, who knew The Critic, had left WMMS, so this show would be local. WAVF General manager Dean Pearce described Dale's show as "intelligent", while program director Greg Patrick described it as "fast-paced", pointing out that the show would include music. Dale described his show as radio's answer to The Daily Show.

On August 31, 2007 at 5 p.m., 96 Wave became known as 96.1 Chuck FM, after stunting for over 20 minutes playing the "Charles in Charge" theme song. The first song played on the new 96.1 FM was "Take This Job and Shove It" by Johnny Paycheck. The final song played on WAVF was "My Wave" by Soundgarden.

On September 6, 2017, the sale of the station to Saga Communications was complete.

101.7 history
101.7 was originally established as a "beautiful music" automated station, operating out of the back room of its big sister AM rocker, WTGR, in Myrtle Beach. By the late 1970s the station had switched to a Top 40/AOR a.k.a. CHR format as "The All New Energy 102 WKZQ" before switching to mainstream rock in the late 1980s, then active rock and finally alternative rock. With this Alternative format, WKZQ-FM was an immensely popular radio station, finding fans across the nation; Rolling Stone even named it one of the "Top 5 Radio Stations" in America.

In September 2008, WKZQ-FM abandoned its historic frequency of 101.7 MHz and migrated to 96.1 MHz in a frequency swap with WAVF.

Previous logos

References

External links
 Official Website

Charleston Post & Courier article on Wave's demise

AVF
Adult hits radio stations in the United States
Radio stations established in 1969
1969 establishments in South Carolina